VPU may refer to:

Technology
 Video processing unit and visual processing unit, related to graphics processing units
 Vision processing unit, a class of processor intended for accelerating machine vision tasks
 Vector processing unit, a special processor architecture with features of pipelining for vector processing

Other uses
 Viral protein U (Vpu), a regulatory protein found in HIV-1
 Vancouver Police Union, a trade union in Canada